The collateral fact doctrine is a doctrine in English law asserted by Diplock LJ in Anisminic v Foreign Compensation Commission. It asserts that in judicial review cases a distinction can be made between misconstruction of an enabling statute for the kind of case meant to be dealt which is a jurisdictional error and a misconstruction of the statutory description of the  situation which would be an error within jurisdiction. Craig has argued that this distinction is impossible to draw.

See also
Judicial review in English Law

References

English law
Judicial review